Ignacio Bogino (born 22 February 1986) is an Argentine footballer who plays for Central Córdoba.

References

Argentine footballers
1986 births
Living people
Rosario Central footballers
Arsenal de Sarandí footballers
Club Atlético Patronato footballers
Club Atlético Temperley footballers
Club Atlético Brown footballers
Central Córdoba de Rosario footballers
Argentine Primera División players
Primera Nacional players
Association football defenders
Footballers from Rosario, Santa Fe